The Strategic Forces Command (SFC), sometimes called Strategic Nuclear Command, forms part of India's Nuclear Command Authority (NCA). It is responsible for the management and administration of the country's tactical and strategic nuclear weapons stockpile. It was created on 4 January 2003 by the Vajpayee Government. Air Marshal Teja Mohan Asthana became its first commander-in-chief.

Responsibility 
It is the responsibility of the Strategic Forces Command to operationalize the directives of the NCA under the leadership of a Commander-in-Chief who is a three-star rank officer. It will have the sole responsibility of initiating the process of delivering nuclear weapons and warheads, after acquiring explicit approval from the NCA. The exact selection of the target area shall be decided by the SFC through a calibrated, cumulative process involving various levels of decision-making, and with formal approval by the NCA.

The SFC manages and administers all strategic forces by exercising complete command and control over nuclear assets, and producing all contingency plans as needed to fulfill the required tasks. Since its inception, the SFC’s command, control and communication systems have been firmly established, and the command has attained a high state of operational readiness.

Assets 

The estimated 68 nuclear warheads of land-based nuclear weapons of India are under the control of and deployed by the Strategic Forces Command, using a variety of both vehicles and launching silos. They currently consist of three different types of ballistic missiles, the Agni-I, the Agni-II, Agni-III, Shaurya and the Army's variant of the Prithvi missile family – the Prithvi-I. Additional variants of the Agni missile series have recently been inducted including the most recent, the Agni-IV and the Agni-V, which is currently being deployed. Agni-VI is also under development, with an estimated range of 8,000–12,000 km and features such as Multiple independently targetable reentry vehicles (MIRVs) or Maneuverable reentry vehicles (MARVs).

The Prithvi missile inducted into India’s Strategic Forces Command in 2003, the first missile to be developed under India’s prestigious IGMDP strengthens India’s nuclear deterrence A missile unit of the elite Strategic Forces Command (SFC) successfully launched a Prithvi missile on 7 January 2014 from the test range at Chandipur.

It was reported by Hindustan Times on 12 September 2010 that to increase its lethal power, India's tri-services strike force is planning to acquire 40 fighter planes capable of delivering nuclear weapons. The SFC has submitted a proposal to the Defence Ministry for setting up two dedicated squadrons of fighter aircraft which will act as a mini-Air Force. This will be the first time that the SFC, which at present depends on the Indian Air Force for delivering nuclear weapons under its command, will have its own aerial assets.

Air-launched nuclear weapons 

Nuclear-armed fighter-bombers were India's first and only nuclear-capable strike force until 2003, when the country's first land-based nuclear ballistic missiles were fielded.

In addition to their ground-attack role, it is believed that the Dassault Mirage 2000s and SEPECAT Jaguars of the Indian Air Force are able to provide a secondary nuclear-strike role. The SEPECAT Jaguar was designed to be able to carry and deploy nuclear weapons and the Indian Air Force has identified the jet as being capable of delivering Indian nuclear weapons. The most likely delivery method would be the use of bombs that are free-falling and unguided.

Three airbases with four squadrons of Mirage 2000H (about 16 aircraft with 16 bombs from 1st and 7th squadrons of the 40th Wing at Maharajpur Air Force Station) and Jaguar IS/IB (about 32 aircraft with 32 bombs from one squadron each at Ambala Air Force Station and Gorakhpur Air Force Station) aircraft, are believed to be assigned the nuclear strike role.

Sea-based ballistic missile 

The Indian Navy has developed two sea-based delivery systems for nuclear weapons, completing Indian ambitions for a nuclear triad, which may have been deployed in 2015.

The first is a submarine-launched system consisting of at least four 6,000 tonne (nuclear-powered) ballistic missile submarines of the Arihant class. The first vessel, INS Arihant, has been launched and will complete extensive sea-trials before being commissioned and declared operational. She is the first nuclear-powered submarine to be built by India. A CIA report claimed that Russia provided technological aid to the naval nuclear propulsion program. The submarines will be armed with up to 12 Sagarika (K-15) missiles armed with nuclear warheads. Sagarika is a submarine-launched ballistic missile with a range of 700 km. This missile has a length of 8.5 meters, weighs seven tonnes and can carry a pay load of up to 500 kg. Sagarika has already been test-fired from an underwater pontoon, but now DRDO is planning a full-fledged test of the missile from a submarine and for this purpose may use the services of the Russian Navy. India's DRDO is also working on a submarine-launched ballistic missile version of the Agni-III missile, known as the Agni-III SL. The new missile will complement the older and less capable Sagarika submarine-launched ballistic missiles. However, the Arihant class ballistic missile submarines will be only capable of carrying a maximum of four Agni-III SL.

The second is a ship-launched system based around the short range ship-launched Dhanush ballistic missile (a variant of the Prithvi missile). It has a range of around 300 km. In the year 2000 the missile was test-fired from INS Subhadra (a Sukanya class patrol craft). INS Subhadra was modified for the test and the missile was launched from the reinforced helicopter deck. The results were considered partially successful. In 2004, the missile was again tested from INS Subhadra and this time the results were reported successful. In December 2005 the missile was tested again, but this time from the destroyer INS Rajput. The test was a success with the missile hitting the land based target.

List of commanders

See also
 Integrated entities 
 Defence Planning Committee, tri-services command at policy level with NSA as its chief
 Defence Cyber Agency, tri-services command
 Integrated Defence Staff, tri-services command at strategic level composed of MoD, MEA and tri-services staff
 Armed Forces Special Operations Division, tri-services command at operational level
 Defence Space Agency, draws staff from all 3 services of Indian Armed Forces
 Strategic Forces Command, nuclear command of India
 Indian Nuclear Command Authority, Strategic Forces Command
 Special Forces of India, tri-services, RAW and internal Security each has own units
 Andaman and Nicobar Command, first operational tri-services command

 Assets
 List of Indian Air Force stations
 List of Indian Navy bases
 List of active Indian Navy ships
 India's overseas military bases

 General concepts
 Joint warfare, general concept
 Minimum Credible Deterrence
 List of cyber warfare forces of other nations

References 

Military units and formations of India
Vajpayee administration
2003 establishments in India
Joint military units and formations of India
Strategic forces